Ngando is a Bantu language in the Soko-Kele languages group that is spoken by the Ngando people in the Democratic Republic of Congo.

References

Soko-Kele languages